Vivian Arend (born March 2, 1965) is a Canadian author of contemporary romance, romantic suspense and paranormal romance novels. She has published books with Harlequin Enterprises, Berkley, Samhain Publishing, and Entangled. Arend has had multiple titles on the USA Today and New York Times bestseller lists. Her Six Pack Ranch series is set in Canada and has appeared on several e-book bestseller lists.

Bibliography

Berkley Romantic Suspense 
 High Risk (2013)
 High Passion (2013)
 High Seduction (2014)

Harlequin Carina Press 
 Tangled Tinsel (2010)

Other publishers 
 Tidal Wave (2009)
 Whirlpool (2010)
 Stormchild (2010)
 Falling, Freestyle (2010)
 The Wind & The Sun (2010)
 Faetful (2010)
 Peerless (2010)
 Fired Up (2010)
 Claiming Derryn (2010)
 Turn It On (2010)
 Turn It Up (2011)
 Stormy Seduction (2011)
 Silent Storm (2011)
 Rising, Freestyle (2011)
 Paradise Found (2011)
 All Fired Up (2014)
 Love is a Battlefield (2014)
 Don't Walk Away (2015)

Granite Lake Wolves series 
 Wolf Signs (2009)
 Wolf Flight (2009)
 Wolf Games (2010)
 Wolf Tracks (2010)
 Wolf Line (2011)
 Wolf Nip (2012)

Takhini Wolves series 
 Black Gold (2011)
 Silver Mine (2012)
 Diamond Dust (2013)
 Moon Shine (2014)

Takhini Shifters series 
 Copper King (2014)
 Laird Wolf (2015)
 A Lady's Heart (2017)
 "Wild Prince" (2018)

Six Pack Ranch series 
 Rocky Mountain Heat (2009)
 Rocky Mountain Haven (2010)
 Rocky Mountain Desire (2012)
 Rocky Mountain Angel (2012)
 Rocky Mountain Rebel (2013)
 Rocky Mountain Freedom (2013)
 Rocky Mountain Romance (2014)
 Rocky Mountain Retreat (2015)
 Rocky Mountain Shelter (2015)
 Rocky Mountain Devil (2016)
 Rocky Mountain Home (2017)

Thompson & Sons series 
 Ride Baby Ride (2014)
 Rocky Ride (2014)
 One Sexy Ride (2014)
 Let It Ride (2015)
 A Wild Ride (2016)

Heart Falls series 
 A Rancher's Heart (2017)
 A Rancher's Song (2018)
 A Rancher's Bride (2018)
 A Firefighter's Christmas Gift (2018)

Collections 
 Winter Wishes (2010)
 Snowed In With A Cowboy (2016)

Awards and nominations 
 2017 - RWA Milestone Inductee 50 published novellas/novels
 2015 - Romantic Times Reviewers Finalist Erotic Romance for "Marked" anthology with Lauren Dane and Kit Rocha
 2014 - RITA Finalist - Paranormal Romance for Diamond Dust
 2014 - RAINBOW Awards finalist for Rocky Mountain Freedom
 2012 - Romantic Times Reviewers Finalist Paranormal/Fantasy for Silver Mine
 2012 - RWA Honor Roll Inductee
 2010 - EPPIE Western Erotic Romance Winner for Rocky Mountain Haven

References 

1965 births
Living people
Canadian romantic fiction writers
Women romantic fiction writers
21st-century Canadian women writers
21st-century Canadian novelists
Canadian women novelists